Topsy Turvy is the second studio album released by blues guitarist Guitar Shorty. The album was released in 1993 on CD by the label Black Top. The tracks "I'm So Glad I Met You", "Mean Husband Blues", "The Bottom Line" and "Hard Life" would later appear on Shorty's compilation album, The Best of Guitar Shorty, in 2006.

Recorded in the U.S., unlike his previous album, My Way or the Highway, the album shows that "it [is] clear that Guitar Shorty was back to stay stateside." AllMusic praises the album, calling it "more impressive than My Way or the Highway... thanks to superior production values and a better handle on his past."

Track listing 
"I'm So Glad I Met You" (Fran, Kearney) — 4:16
"I Just Can't Run Away from the Blues" (Fran, Kearney, Scott) — 4:25
"Mean Husband Blues" (Kearney, Pembroke) — 3:53
"The Bottom Line" (George Jackson, Wilie Mitchell, Earl Randle) — 3:52
"I Never Thought" (Kearney) — 2:36
"Hard Life" (Kearney) — 5:17
"Jody" (Kent Barker, Don Davis, James Skeet Wilson) — 4:43
"It All Went Down the Drain" (Earl King) — 4:49
"How Long Can It Last?" (Kearney) — 3:13
"Old Time Sake" (Kearney) — 4:16
"You Confuse Me" (Kearney) — 2:46
"More Than You'll Ever Know" (Al Kooper) — 6:02

Personnel
 David Torkanowsky — organ (hammond)
 Ernest Youngblood, Jr. — saxophone (tenor)
 Clarence Hollimon, Derek O'Brien — guitar
 Guitar Shorty — guitar, vocals
 Mark "Kaz" Kazanoff — saxophone (baritone, tenor)
 Sarah Brown, Lee Allen Zeno — bass
 Herman V. Ernest III, George Rains — percussion, drums
 Floyd Domino — piano
 Carol Fran — vocals
 Kamikaze Horns — horn
 Michael Mordecai — trombone
 Keith Winking — trumpet

References

1993 albums
Guitar Shorty albums